Juchitán is a settlement in Juchitán Municipality, in the Mexican state of Guerrero. It is part of the region of the state known as the Costa Chica.

In the 2005 INEGI census, the municipal seat reported a population of 2,944, compared to 6,240 for the municipality as a whole.

References

External links
Juchitán, Gro. (Enciclopedia de los Municipios de México)

Populated places in Guerrero